Extarademus umbratus is a species of true bug in the family Blissidae. It is found in Central America, North America, and South America.

References

Blissidae
Articles created by Qbugbot
Insects described in 1893